"The Platonic Blow, by Miss Oral" (sometimes known as "A Day for a Lay" or "The Gobble Poem") is an erotic poem by W. H. Auden.  Thought to have been written in 1948, the poem gleefully describes in graphic detail a homosexual encounter involving an act of fellatio.

Poem
The syncopated poem runs to 34 stanzas of four lines, with an ABAB rhyming scheme. The meter is borrowed from Charles Williams's mystical Arthurian poem Taliessin through Logres. Auden mixes demotic argot with formal expression, using clever internal and external rhymes and half-rhymes.   The first verse starts:

It was a spring day, a day for a lay when the air
Smelled like a locker-room, a day to blow or get blown.

History
Auden described writing a "purely pornographic" poem in a letter to Chester Kallman in December 1948, as an addition to the "Auden Corpus".  Auden jokingly suggesting that Kallman write a similar poem about "the other Major Act" (anal sex) to be published together on "rubber paper for dirty old millionaires" with illustrations by Paul Cadmus.  He also wrote the poem to demonstrate his true nature to Professor Norman Holmes Pearson, with whom Auden was collaborating on a poetry anthology.

Copies were circulated to Auden's friends but it remained unpublished until 1965, when Ed Sanders obtained a copy from an employee of the Morgan Library and published it (without Auden's permission) in his New York counterculture magazine Fuck You / A Magazine of the Arts (Vol 5 No 8) in March 1965, with a cover by Andy Warhol.  The poem was included without a title, described as "a gobble poem snatched from the notebooks of WH Auden". A brief publication history of "The Platonic Blow" appears in Bloomfield and Mendelsohn's 1972 bibliography of Auden's work (University of Virginia Press, Charlottesville, VA, p 366 ff.)

Auden admitted his authorship to friends, and in print in the Daily Telegraph Magazine in 1968.  It was published by the European magazine Suck in October 1969, again without permission, under the title "The Gobble Poem" and then by Avante Garde magazine in 1970 entitled "A Day for a Lay". However, by 1970, Auden was denying authorship, and returned the royalty cheque.

A separate edition of the poem, followed by a scabrous haiku ("My Epitaph"), has been available since 1985 from Orchises Press in Alexandria, Virginia.

The sensual description of a homosexual sex act has been compared to the long 1970s poem "Ode" by Mutsuo Takahashi.

References

 The Animals: Love Letters Between Christopher Isherwood and Don Bachardy, Christopher Isherwood, Don Bachardy, p. 116, 211
 Articulate Flesh: Male Homo-Eroticism and Modern Poetry, Gregory Woods, p. 168
 Encyclopedia of the New York School Poets, Terence Diggory, p. 373
 Fug You: An Informal History of the Peace Eye Bookstore, the Fuck You Press, Ed Sanders, p. 131
 The Cambridge Companion to W. H. Auden, edited by Stan Smith, p. 22
 W. H. Auden in Context, edited by Tony Sharpe p. 122
 All Poets Welcome: The Lower East Side Poetry Scene in the 1960s, Daniel Kane, p. 70
 Encyclopedia of Erotic Literature, edited by Gaëtan Brulotte, John Phillips, p. 92

1948 poems
Poetry by W. H. Auden
Poems about sexuality